David Byron Merry, CMG (born 16 September 1945) was High Commissioner to Botswana from 2001

He was at the Ministry of Aviation from 1961 to 1965 when he entered the HM Diplomatic Service. He served in Bangkok, Budapest, Bonn, East Berlin, Manila and Karachi before his Gaborone appointment.

References

People educated at Ecclesfield Grammar School
People educated at King Edward VII School, Sheffield
High Commissioners of the United Kingdom to Botswana
1945 births
Living people
Companions of the Order of St Michael and St George